Leslie Watson (born 17 August 1956) is a New Zealand cricketer. He played in one first-class and three List A matches for Canterbury in 1978/79.

See also
 List of Canterbury representative cricketers

References

External links
 

1956 births
Living people
New Zealand cricketers
Canterbury cricketers
Cricketers from Christchurch